Celadon Leeds Daboll (July 18, 1818 in Groton, Connecticut –  October 13, 1866 in New London, Connecticut), was a merchant in New London, Connecticut. From 1854 to 1861 he was employed in the U.S. Department of the Interior in Washington, D.C.

He conceived the idea of applying the principle of the clarinet to a large trumpet, to serve as a fog signal for mariners, known as the Daboll trumpet.

References

1818 births
1866 deaths
American civil servants
People from Groton, Connecticut